The 1973 Richmond Spiders football team represented the Richmond College during the 1973 NCAA Division I football season. The Spiders, coached by Frank Jones in his 8th season, compiled a 8–2 record (5–1 and 2nd in conference play), and outscored their opponents 298 to 112.  They were ranked for one week in the AP poll before an upset loss against Louisiana–Monroe.

Schedule

References

Richmond
Richmond Spiders football seasons
Richmond Spiders football